John Philip or Phillip may refer to:

John Phillip (poet) (before 1540—after 1590), English dramatist
John Philip (missionary) (1775–1851), Scottish advocate for indigenous rights in South Africa
John 'Spanish' Phillip (1817–1867), Scottish painter
John Woodward "Jack" Philip (1840–1900), American admiral
John R. Philip (1927–1999) Australian soil physicist

See also
John Phillips (disambiguation)